Hatutu (also called Hatuta‘a) is a small island approximately 3 km (2 mi.) northeast of Eiao in the northern Marquesas Islands.

Hatutu is administratively part of the commune (municipality) of Nuku-Hiva, itself in the administrative subdivision of the Marquesas Islands.

It consists of a high central ridge, which runs the full 6.5 km (4 mi.) length of the island.  The ridge rises to heights up to 428 m (1,404 ft.) above sea level.

In 1992, Hatutu was declared a nature reserve:  the Hatutu Nature Reserve.  The island is an important nesting ground for red-footed booby, black noddy, white tern, great frigatebird, and masked booby, and home to the endemic northern Marquesan reed warbler and the Marquesan ground dove.  It is also the largest breeding site of Phoenix Petrel in French Polynesia.

The island is plagued by Polynesian rat (Rattus exulens) a species introduced by humans sometime in the last several hundred years. The rats likely prey upon native animals and plants potentially changing the ecosystem dynamic on the island.

See also

 French Polynesia
 Marquesan Nature Reserves
 Desert island
 List of islands

References

Islands of the Marquesas Islands
Uninhabited islands of French Polynesia